(an alternative spelling of ) is a Latin phrase meaning "Queen of Heaven" (a title in reference to Mary, mother of Jesus).

As a proper name, Regina Coeli can refer to:
 Church of Regina Coeli (Hyde Park) in New York
 Regina Coeli Convent Church in Mexico City
 Regina Coeli Monastery in Bettendorf, Iowa
 Regina Coeli (prison) in Rome, Italy
 Santa Maria Regina Coeli, a church in Naples, Italy

See also
 Regina caeli